Pinaki Chaudhuri  পিনাকী চৌধুরী (19 September 1940 – 24 October 2022) was an Indian academic and film director.

Career 

Chaudhuri started his career as a tabla player, trained by Ustad Kermatullah Khan and accompanied the Legend Pandit Ravi Shankar in London.

Chaudhuri's academic career spanned from studying Physics at Jadavpur University culminating in exposure to Electrical engineering course at London University. 

He entered the film world initially as a producer and subsequently as a director. His journey as a filmmaker included several acclaimed telefilms and feature films. He was awarded with two National Awards for the Best Feature Film in Bengali, first one in 1996 for Shonghaath and again in 2007 for Ballygunge Court. Chowdhury was honoured as Jury Member in various Film Festivals and was the Chairman of the Jury Board for selection of Indian films for National Awards.

Personal life and death 
Chaudhuri died from cancer on 24 October 2022, at the age of 82.

Filmography

As director
Chena Achena (1983)
Sanghat (1996)
Kakababu Here Gelen? (1995)
Ek Tukro Chand (2001)
Ballygunge Court (2007)
Arohan (2010)

References

External links
pinakichaudhuri.com - about

1940 births
2022 deaths
Film producers from Kolkata
Indian expatriates in the United Kingdom
Jadavpur University alumni
Alumni of the University of London
Film directors from Kolkata
20th-century Indian film directors
21st-century Indian film directors